Manuel is a studio album of songs by Dalida recorded and released in 1974.

Track listing
 Manuel
 Seule avec moi
 Justine
 Ta femme
 Anima mia
 Nous sommes tous morts à 20 ans
 Ma vie je la chante
 La consultation
 Comme tu dois avoir froid
 Des gens qu'on aimerait connaître
 Gigi l'amoroso

Singles
1974 Gigi l'amoroso (Gigi l'amour) / Il venait d'avoir 18 ans
1974 Ta femme
1974 Manuel

See also
 List of Dalida songs
 Dalida albums discography
 Dalida singles discography

References
 Dalida Official Website

External links
 Dalida Official Website "Discography" section

Dalida albums
1974 albums